Executive Drive station is a San Diego Trolley station in San Diego, California, located near the intersection of Executive Drive and Genesee Avenue. The station began service on November 21, 2021 on the Blue Line; it was constructed as part of the Mid-Coast Trolley extension project.

Station layout 
There are two tracks, each served by a side platform.

References 

Blue Line (San Diego Trolley)
San Diego Trolley stations in San Diego
Railway stations in the United States opened in 2021